Christopher de Souza (born 21 January 1976) is a Singaporean politician and lawyer who has been serving as Deputy Speaker of the Parliament of Singapore since 2020. A member of the governing People's Action Party (PAP), he has been the Member of Parliament (MP) representing the Ulu Pandan division of Holland–Bukit Timah GRC since 2006.

A lawyer by profession, de Souza has been working at Lee & Lee since 2006 and had also worked at WongPartnership between 2011 and 2014. 

Prior to entering politics in the 2006 general election, he had worked in the Singapore Legal Service.

Early life and education
De Souza was educated at St. Michael's Primary School, St. Joseph's Institution and Raffles Junior College before graduating from King's College London in 2000 with a Bachelor of Laws with first class honours degree. 

He subsequently went on to complete a Bachelor of Civil Law with distinction degree at the University of Oxford in 2001 under a scholarship.

He had also represented Singapore in hockey at various tournaments until 2005.

Career

Public service 
De Souza started his career in the Singapore Legal Service in 2002 as a Justice's Law Clerk to Chief Justice Yong Pung How. He served as Deputy Public Prosecutor and State Counsel at the Attorney-General's Chambers between 2004 and 2005 before becoming a Magistrate at the Subordinate Courts and Assistant Registrar at the High Court between 2005 and 2006.

Legal career 
De Souza joined Lee & Lee in 2006 as a Senior Associate before he became a Partner in 2008. In 2011, he left Lee & Lee and joined WongPartnership as a Partner. In 2015, he left WongPartnership and returned to Lee & Lee as a Partner.

In 2022, De Souza was found guilty of professional misconduct by a Disciplinary Tribunal of the Law Society of Singapore for assisting a client in the suppression of evidence.

Political career 
De Souza made his political debut in the 2006 general election when he joined a five-member People's Action Party (PAP) team contesting in Holland–Bukit Timah GRC. The PAP team won by an uncontested walkover and de Souza thus became a Member of Parliament representing the Ulu Pandan ward of Holland–Bukit Timah GRC.

During the 2011 general election, de Souza joined the four-member PAP team contesting in Holland–Bukit Timah GRC. After they won with 60.08% of the vote against the Singapore Democratic Party, de Souza continued serving as the Member of Parliament representing the Ulu Pandan ward of Holland–Bukit Timah GRC. He retained his parliamentary seats in the subsequent general elections in 2015 and 2020 after the PAP team in Holland–Bukit Timah GRC won with 66.60% and 66.36% of the vote against the Singapore Democratic Party in those two general elections.

De Souza has served on various Government Parliamentary Committees (GPCs) since 2006, and has been the Deputy Chairman for the GPC on Manpower from 2011 to 2015, and Chairman for the GPC on Home Affairs and Law since 2015. In 2009, he was nominated as a Young Global Leader at the World Economic Forum. On 31 August 2020, de Souza and Jessica Tan were elected as Deputy Speakers of Parliament.

Personal life
De Souza is a Catholic. He and his wife Sharon have four children.

References

External links 
 Christopher de Souza on Parliament of Singapore

Living people
1976 births
Saint Joseph's Institution, Singapore alumni
Raffles Junior College alumni
Alumni of King's College London
Alumni of the University of Oxford
Members of the Parliament of Singapore
People's Action Party politicians
Singaporean Roman Catholics